Dendrograptus is an extinct genus of graptolites from the Lower Ordovician.

References 

Graptolite genera
Ordovician invertebrates
Paleozoic life of the Northwest Territories
Paleozoic life of Quebec